Kye Ung-thae (2 February 1925 - 23 November 2006) was a North Korean politician who served among others as Vice Premier of North Korea and a member of the Politburo of the Workers' Party of Korea.

Biography
Born on February 25, 1925, in Hirawon-gun, South Pyongan Province. He graduated from the Soviet High Party School. Since November 1967 he was a Deputy to the Supreme People's Assembly. In December 1967 he became Trade Minister. In November 1970 he became a member of the Central Committee of the Workers' Party of Korea. In December 1975 he became Vice Premier of North Korea. In 1980 he became a member of the politburo. In November 1985 he became Party Secretary (Public Security). In February 1986, at the 11th Plenary Session of the 6th Central Committee of the Workers' Party of Korea, he was appointed as a secretary of the secretariat in charge of public security. Ri Kun-mo and Kim Hwan also became secretaries. In the November 1986 parliamentary election he was elected a member of the Supreme People's Assembly. In December 1986 he became Chairman of the Supreme People's Assembly Legislative Committee. He became a member of the party's Politburo in March 1988. He died in 2006 of lung cancer.

References

Citations

Bibliography
Books:
 

North Korean atheists
North Korean communists
Members of the 8th Supreme People's Assembly
Government ministers of North Korea
1925 births
2006 deaths
Workers' Party of Korea politicians

ko:계응태